"I'm So Sorry Baby" is the Brilliant Green's fourteenth single, released on October 9, 2002. It peaked at #15 on the Oricon Singles Chart.

Track listing

References

2002 singles
2002 songs
Songs written by Shunsaku Okuda
Songs written by Tomoko Kawase
Sony Music Entertainment Japan singles
The Brilliant Green songs